West Haldon is a locality split between Toowoomba Region and Lockyer Valley Region in Queensland, Australia.

Geography 
West Haldon is in South East Queensland.

The southern boundary roughly follows the watershed of Lockyer Creek.

Road infrastructure
The Gatton–Clifton Road runs through from north to south.

History 
West Haldon Provisional School opened on 7 April 1896. On 1 January 1909 it became West Haldon State School. It closed on 18 September 1949.

References

Toowoomba Region
Lockyer Valley Region
Localities in Queensland